Amalie Dideriksen (born 24 May 1996) is a Danish road and track cyclist, who rides for UCI Women's WorldTeam .

Career
She won the junior women's road race at the World Championships in 2013 and 2014 as well as a bronze medal in the scratch race at the 2013 UCI Juniors Track World Championships. In both 2014 and 2015, she won the Danish national road race championship and in 2015, she also won silver in the women's omnium at the European Track Championships.  Dideriksen participated in the women's omnium at the 2016 Summer Olympics. Ranking 9th after the flying lap, she surprised everyone by winning the points race thus elevating her to an overall 5th place.

On 15 October 2016, Dideriksen won the World Championship road race in Doha, Qatar, beating Kirsten Wild and Lotta Lepistö in a bunch sprint. By doing this, she joined select group riders consisting of Marianne Vos, Pauline Ferrand-Prévot, Nicole Cooke and Dideriksen's own national coach, Catherine Marsal, who are all former junior world champions who have since become elite world champions.

In October 2020, Dideriksen signed a two-year contract with the  team, from the 2021 season.

At the 2020 Summer Olympics, Dideriksen again represented Denmark in the omnium discipline, finishing 4th. She also participated in the Madison with Julie Leth finishing second, bringing home an Olympic silver medal.

Major results
Source:

Road

2011
 National Novice Road Championships
1st  Road race
1st  Time trial
2013
 1st  Road race, UCI Junior Road World Championships
 1st  Time trial, National Junior Road Championships
 10th Time trial, UEC European Junior Road Championships
2014
 1st  Road race, UCI Junior Road World Championships
 1st  Road race, National Road Championships
 3rd Time trial, National Junior Road Championships
2015
 National Road Championships
1st  Road race
3rd Time trial
 1st  Young rider classification Ladies Tour of Norway
 2nd Overall Belgium Tour
1st  Sprints classification
1st  Young rider classification
1st Stage 3
 9th Acht van Westerveld
2016
 1st  Road race, UCI Road World Championships
 Holland Ladies Tour
1st Stages 1 & 2 (TTT)
 1st Stage 1 (TTT) Energiewacht Tour
 2nd Road race, National Road Championships
2017
 1st Ronde van Drenthe
 1st Crescent Vårgårda UCI Women's WorldTour TTT
 1st Stage 1 (TTT) Giro d'Italia Femminile
 3rd  Road race, UCI Road World Championships
 3rd Acht van Westerveld
 5th Road race, UEC European Road Championships
 7th Prudential RideLondon Classique
 9th Overall Healthy Ageing Tour
1st Stage 2 (TTT)
 9th Omloop van het Hageland
 9th Pajot Hills Classic
2018
 1st  Road race, National Road Championships
 1st Postnord UCI WWT Vårgårda WestSweden TTT
 Holland Ladies Tour
1st Stages 3 & 4
 1st Stage 3b (TTT) Healthy Ageing Tour
 1st Stage 4 The Women's Tour
 2nd  Team time trial, UCI Road World Championships
 10th Dwars door Vlaanderen
 10th Prudential RideLondon Classique
2019
 1st  Road race, National Road Championships
 6th Ronde van Drenthe
2020
 1st  Time trial, National Road Championships
2021
 1st  Road race, National Road Championships
 9th Scheldeprijs
2022
 1st Postnord Vårgårda WestSweden TTT
 1st Stage 1 (TTT) Challenge by La Vuelta
 3rd Road race, National Road Championships

Track

2010
 National Championships
1st  Omnium
1st  Points race
1st  Scratch
 3rd Individual pursuit, National Junior Championships
2013
 3rd  Scratch, UCI Juniors World Championships
 3rd Points race, Ballerup Points Event
2014
 1st  Scratch, UCI Juniors World Championships
2015
 UEC European Under-23 Championships
1st  Individual pursuit
1st  Omnium
 1st Omnium, UIV Talents Cup Final
 2nd  Omnium, UEC European Championships
 Irish International Track GP
2nd Omnium
2nd Scratch
 3rd  Scratch, 2015–16 UCI Track Cycling World Cup, Cambridge
 6 giorni delle rose – Fiorenzuola
3rd Omnium
3rd Scratch
 3rd Omnium, Grand Prix of Poland
2016
 National Championships
1st  Omnium
1st  Points race
1st  Individual pursuit
1st  Scratch
1st  Sprint
 Revolution – Round 1, Manchester
1st Points race
2nd Scratch
 3rd Scratch, Revolution Champions League Round 1 – Manchester
2017
 1st  Omnium, National Championships
 Prilba Moravy
1st Omnium
1st Scratch
 1st Omnium, Grand Prix Favorit Brno
 UEC European Under-23 Championships
2nd  Points race
3rd  Omnium
3rd  Scratch
 Revolution Series – Champions League Round 1, London
2nd Points race
2nd Scratch
 Omnium, 2017–18 UCI Track Cycling World Cup
3rd  Pruszków
3rd  Manchester
2018
 Madison, 2018–19 UCI Track Cycling World Cup (with Julie Leth)
1st  Saint-Quentin-en-Yvelines
2nd  Milton
2nd  Berlin
 1st  Madison, UEC European Track Championships (with Julie Leth)
 UCI World Championships
2nd  Omnium
3rd  Scratch
2019
 1st  Madison, UEC European Track Championships (with Julie Leth)
 3rd  Madison, UCI World Championships (with Julie Leth)
2020
 1st  Madison, National Championships (with Trine Schmidt)
2021
 National Championships
1st  Madison (with Karoline Hemmsen)
1st  Omnium
1st  Points race
 2nd  Madison, Olympic Games (with Julie Leth)
 2nd  Madison, UEC European Championships (with Julie Leth)
2022
 3rd  Madison, UCI Nations Cup (with Julie Leth)
 3rd  Madison, UEC European Championships (with Julie Leth)

See also
2015 Boels Dolmans Cycling Team season

References

External links
 
 
 
 
 
 
 

1996 births
Danish female cyclists
Danish track cyclists
Living people
People from Tårnby Municipality
Olympic cyclists of Denmark
Cyclists at the 2016 Summer Olympics
Cyclists at the 2020 Summer Olympics
Medalists at the 2020 Summer Olympics
Olympic medalists in cycling
Olympic silver medalists for Denmark
UCI Road World Champions (women)
Sportspeople from the Capital Region of Denmark
20th-century Danish women
21st-century Danish women